Top Country Albums is a chart that ranks the top-performing country music albums in the United States, published by Billboard.  In 1986, 22 different albums topped the chart, based on sales reports submitted by a representative sample of stores nationwide.

In the issue of Billboard dated January 4, Kenny Rogers was at number one with the album The Heart of the Matter, its second week in the top spot.  It would remain atop the chart through the issue dated February 1 for a final total of six weeks at number one but would prove to be the last of the 11 chart-toppers which the singer achieved in his lifetime; he would top the chart again in 2020 shortly after his death.  Many of 1986's chart-topping acts were identified with the neotraditional country trend, which moved away from the pop music-influenced style with which acts such as Rogers had dominated the country charts in the earlier part of the decade in favour of a sound closer to the genre's roots.  George Strait, Randy Travis, Dwight Yoakam and Steve Earle were all associated with the neotraditional movement.  Travis's album Storms of Life spent eight weeks at number one, the most by an album in 1986.  Travis, Yoakam and Earle all reached number one for the first time in 1986, as did Lee Greenwood, Dan Seals, Earl Thomas Conley, John Schneider, Ray Stevens, Janie Fricke and Reba McEntire, who would go on to become one of the most successful female singers in country music history, selling more than 50 million albums.  

Two acts achieved more than one number one in 1986.  The band Alabama spent five weeks in the top spot beginning in April with Greatest Hits and seven weeks at number one beginning in November with The Touch, which was the year's final chart-topper.  The band's total of twelve weeks at number one was the most for any act, and the seven weeks which The Touch spent in the top spot was the year's longest unbroken run at number one; this run would be extended by a further three weeks in 1987.  The two albums brought the total number of chart-toppers achieved by the most successful country music band of the 1980s to seven.  Hank Williams Jr. had three number ones in 1986, beginning with a two-week spell atop the chart in February with Greatest Hits Volume 2.  In May, Five-O, which had been released a year earlier and spent time at number one in the summer of 1985, returned to the top spot for one week.  Finally, the singer spent four weeks in the peak position beginning in the issue of Billboard dated September 6 with Montana Cafe.  Having not reached number one at all between 1969 and 1984, the second-generation star had now achieved four consecutive chart-toppers in less than three years.

Chart history

References

1986
1986 record charts